Palpares libelluloides is a species of antlion in the genus Palpares belonging to the family Myrmeleontidae . It is found across Southern Europe.

Description 
The very broad wings are mottled dark brown. The males can be recognized by their long, delicate genital appendages.

The day-and night-active imagos can be observed from May to September. Their flight is usually short and close to the ground.

The specific name libelluloides means "dragonfly-like" (cf the dragonfly genus Libellula).

Distribution 
This species is widespread in the Mediterranean regions and it is mainly present in Albania, Bulgaria, France, Greece, Hungary, Italy, Romania, Spain and Turkey. It can be found in  thickets and rocky slopes up to about 1000 meters above sea level.

References 

 Biolib
 Fauna europaea

External links 
   Doritbarzakay

Myrmeleontidae
Neuroptera of Europe
Insects described in 1764
Taxa named by Carl Linnaeus